Historic Lac qui Parle County (fr:Lake that Talks) was a county located in the state of Minnesota.  It was located on the north side of the Minnesota River, across the river from the mouth of the Lac qui Parle River.  The old county was created when it was split off from Pierce County in 1862.  It was deorganized in 1868, and absorbed into what now are parts of Stevens, Swift, and Chippewa counties.

Contemporary Lac qui Parle County, located on the south side of the Minnesota River and established in 1871, now bears this name.

References 

Lac qui Parle